Amsinckia lunaris is an uncommon species of fiddleneck known by the common name bent-flowered fiddleneck. It is endemic to California, where it grows in the San Francisco Bay Area, the woods of the coastal and inland mountains just north, and the Central Valley and its San Joaquin Valley.

Description
Amsinckia lunaris is a bristly annual herb with coiled inflorescences of tubular orange flowers similar to those of other fiddlenecks, except for the characteristic bend in the flower tube. The flowers are about a centimeter long and less in width at the face.

See also
Ethmia albitogata — endemic moth, feeds on Amsinckia lunaris.

References

External links
Jepson Manual Treatment - Amsinckia lunaris
Amsinckia lunaris - Photo gallery

lunaris
Endemic flora of California
Natural history of the California chaparral and woodlands
Natural history of the California Coast Ranges
Natural history of the Central Valley (California)
Natural history of the San Francisco Bay Area
Plants described in 1917